Apotoforma hodgesi is a species of moth of the family Tortricidae. It is found in Panama.

The wingspan is about 14 mm. The ground colour of the forewings is brownish with a cinnamon hue and with an indistinct brownish grey spot at the middle of the costa followed by a trace of suffusion marked by a few black scales. There is also a row of delicate brownish terminal dots. The hindwings are brown-grey.

References

Moths described in 1993
Tortricini
Moths of Central America